Jeferson da Costa Silva (born May 3, 1990 in Nova Iguaçu) is a Brazilian footballer who currently plays for Madureira Esporte Clube.

Career
It started at the base of Nova Iguaçu.

In 2008, he was loaned to Vasco da Gama. In 2010, he signed Vasco on permanent deal.

Career statistics
(Correct )

References

External links
 ogol.com.br

1990 births
Living people
Brazilian footballers
CR Vasco da Gama players
Salgueiro Atlético Clube players
Association football midfielders
People from Nova Iguaçu
Sportspeople from Rio de Janeiro (state)